Talduwe Ratugama Rallage Weris Singho, better known as Talduwe Somarama Thero (27 August 1915 – 6 July 1962), shot and killed S. W. R. D. Bandaranaike, the fourth Prime Minister of Ceylon (later Sri Lanka), who served from 1956 until his assassination by Somarama  in 1959.

Early life
Somarama Thero was born on 27 August 1915, to Iso Hamy and Ratugama Rallage Dieris Appuhamy. He was robed when he was 14 on 20 January 1929, and received his schooling at Talduwa Ihala School. He allegedly received his higher ordination as a Thero (Buddhist monk) in Kandy on 25 June 1936.

The assassination

Allegedly drafted into the conspiracy by Mapitigama Buddharakkitha Thero, the chief incumbent of the Kelaniya Raja Maha Vihara, Somarama Thero reluctantly consented to assassinate the Prime Minister "for the greater good of his country, race and religion". Buddharakkitha Thero attributed Bandaranaike's failure to aggressively pursue the nationalist reforms as the motive to eliminate him.

The date was set to 25 September 1959, when Somarama Thero was to visit the Prime Minister at his home and shoot him at point blank range. His saffron robes gave him free access to Tintagel, the private residence of Bandaranaike, in Rosmead Place, Colombo. As the Premier commenced his routine meetings with the public, Somarama waited in patience for his turn. When the monk's presence was announced to him, Bandaranaike rose to greet him in the traditional Buddhist manner. The assassin then pulled out the revolver hidden in his robes and fired at the prostrate Prime Minister. Somarama was injured in firing between himself and the Prime Minister's bodyguards.

Somarama Thero then faced trial, along with four other involved in the conspiracy. It was a hopeless case, and in spite of a resourceful defense the jury unanimously found Somarama Thero guilty of the capital offense. Before sentencing him to death, the trial judge, Justice T.S. Fernando, QC, CBE, told Somarama Thero he had a "streak of conscience as he did not attend court in his saffron robes." The chief conspirator, Mapitigama Buddharakkitha Thero and H. P. Jayawardena, a businessman closely associated with him, were found guilty of conspiracy to murder. Bandaranaike had suspended capital punishment, but after his death the government had it restored. In an apparent blunder by the draftsman, the law re-establishing the death penalty failed to include conspiracy to murder. As a consequence, while Somarama Thero would hang, the two chief conspirators escaped with life sentences.

Somarama Thero was hanged at Welikada Prison on 6 July 1962. He gave up his robes a fortnight before his hanging and, two days before his execution, was baptized as a Christian by an Anglican priest.

Footnotes

Further reading 
 A.C. Alles, Famous Criminal Cases of Sri Lanka, Volume III: The Assassination of Prime Minister SWRD Bandaranaike (Dec-1979): Published by the author. Hardcover published by Vantage, Inc., N.Y., U.S.A. 1986 as The Assassination of a Prime Minister. .
Lucian G. Weeramantry, The Assassination of a Prime Minister - The Bandaranaike Murder Case (Hardcover, Geneva, Switzerland, 1969).
 Firoze Sameer, dOSSIEr COREA: A portfolio on crime (Colombo, Sri Lanka, 1999) . 
Seneviratne, H.L: Buddhist monks and ethnic politics. Anthropology Today, April 2001; 17(2): 15–21.
Weeramantry, L.G: Assassination of a Prime Minister – The Bandaranaike Murder Case, Geneva, 1969.

External links
 Assassination of Bandaranaike (SRI LANKA: THE UNTOLD STORY at Asia Times OnLine)

1915 births
Converts to Christianity from Buddhism
Sri Lankan Buddhists
Sri Lankan Christians
Sri Lankan assassins
Executed Sri Lankan people
People executed by Sri Lanka by hanging
Executed assassins
20th-century executions by Sri Lanka
People convicted of murder by Sri Lanka
Sri Lankan people convicted of murder
Assassins of heads of government
1962 deaths